Gumby is an album produced by Shepard Stern and released in 1989 as a tribute to Art Clokey's stop-motion animated series Gumby.  The cover is reminiscent of The Beatles' White Album.

Track listing

Additional personnel
Executive producer: Shepard Stern
Associate producers: Ron Kidd and Pat Patrick
Art direction: Dick Duerrstein

1989 albums
Novelty albums